Emory University Hospital Midtown (originally Emory Crawford Long Hospital) is a 511-bed acute care teaching hospital located in the SoNo district of Atlanta, Georgia, United States, and affiliated with Emory Healthcare. The hospital's CEO is Dan Owens. Emory University Hospital Midtown is staffed by more than 1,000 private-practice and Emory Clinic physicians, spanning 28 specialties including cardiology, cardiothoracic surgery, oncology, neurosciences, general and vascular surgery, internal medicine, urology, obstetrics and gynecology.  There is a level III neonatal ICU.

History 
Emory's Midtown hospital celebrated its 100-year anniversary in 2008.

The institution's history dates back to 1908, when two physicians, Dr. Edward Campbell Davis and a former student of his, Dr. Luther C. Fischer, opened the 26-bed Davis-Fischer Sanatorium on Crew Street, near present-day Turner Field.  With just 26 beds, the hospital quickly outgrew its capacity and by 1911, Davis and Fischer moved the hospital to its present site, opening an 85-bed Davis-Fischer Sanatorium on Linden Avenue.

In 1931, the hospital was renamed Crawford W. Long Memorial Hospital in honor of Dr. Crawford W. Long, the Georgia physician who discovered sulphuric ether for use as an anesthetic, and was the first doctor to use anesthesia during surgery.

Emory Crawford Long Hospital was renamed "Emory University Hospital Midtown", effective February 13, 2009.  However, as part of Emory's commitment to honor a more than 100-year history of the original name, 'Crawford W. Long Memorial Hospital' is retained on exterior monuments.

References

External links

Emory University Hospital Midtown
Emory Crawford Long Hospital
Emory Healthcare Web site

Hospitals in Atlanta
Hospital buildings completed in 1911
1908 establishments in Georgia (U.S. state)